Huahine is an island located among the Society Islands, in French Polynesia, an overseas territory of France in the Pacific Ocean. It is part of the Leeward Islands group (Îles sous le Vent). At the 2017 census it had a population of 6,075.

History
Human presence on Huahine dates back to ancient times, as evidenced by the numerous Marae on the island. Archaeologists estimate that the ancient Tahitian Ma'ohi people colonized Huahine from at least the 9th century AD. Huahine is home to one of the largest concentrations of Polynesian archaeological remains dated between 850 AD and 1100 AD.

Independent kingdom
Until the late 19th century, Huahine was an independent kingdom, also called the Huahine and Maia'o Kingdom. According to tradition, three main dynasties succeeded each other:

The Hau-mo'o-rere dynasty was founded in the 17th century; its last representative was Queen Teha'apapa I, whom Captain Cook met in 1769. She maintained the cohesion and independence of her kingdom.

The Tamatoa dynasty has its origin in Teha'apapa I and her husband Mato a Tamatoa, member of the Tamatoa family of Raiatea. They are the founders of the Tamatoa branch of Huahine. This dynasty reigned until 1854.

The Teurura'i dynasty descends from Ari'imate Teurura'i, a Huahine chief, and his wife Teri'iteporouara'i Tamatoa, member of the Tamatoa family of Raiatea, great-granddaughter of Queen Teha'apapa I of Huahine. This dynasty reigned from 1854 to 1895.

Teriifa'atau Marama Polynesian prince, could claim the thrones of Huahine and Raiatea at the same time. However, the union of these two thrones under one scepter could not be contemplated, so it was agreed that his younger brother would inherit the throne of Raiatea.

In 1884, he obtained the position of prime minister of the Kingdom, a post previously held by his younger brother, who became King of Raiatea in 1884.

He became the protagonist of the annexation of the kingdom of Huahine and Maia'o to France. It was in 1895 that the regent, on behalf of Queen Tehaapapa, and the principal chiefs of the kingdom fully renounced their powers and attributions in favor of France in a treaty of abdication dated 15 September of the same year.

After the annexation, he was elected chief of Tefareri'i, a position he held until his death.

European exploration and colonization
The name Huahine literally means "woman's sex". It could probably be translated as "pregnant woman" since the profile of Mount Tavaiura makes one think of a pregnant woman lying down. 

Captain James Cook arrived in Fare Harbour on 16 July 1769, with Tupaia navigating . They met with leading chief Ori (Mato).  Cook returned on 3 September 1773 and met with Ori's son Teri'itaria, the new ari'i rahi of the island.

Missionary Auna served as a deacon on Huahine prior to his work in Hawaii.

The Spaniard Domingo Bonaechea in 1775, called the island "La Hermosa" (The Beautiful). Today it is known by the nickname "the island of the woman".

In 1846 the island successfully resisted French rule, the inhabitants never resigned themselves to the idea of being colonized and in 1847 the island proclaimed itself an independent state under the name of the Kingdom of Huahine.

On 20 April 1879, the commander of the SMS Bismarck, Karl Deinhard, and the German Empire's consul for the South Sea Islands, Gustav Godeffroy Junior, signed a treaty of friendship and commerce with the island's government on behalf of the German Empire.

In 1888 the French finally established a protectorate over the Island. The hitherto independent kingdom of Huahine and Maia'o was not annexed until 1895 (deposing the last queen Te-ha'apapa III) and incorporated into the French Establishments of Oceania, now French Polynesia, which had existed since 1898.

Geography
It is made up of two main islands surrounded by a fringing coral reef with several islets, or motu. Huahine Nui (Big Huahine) lies to the north and Huahine Iti (Little Huahine) to the south. The total land area is 75 km2. The two islands are separated by a few hundred metres of water and joined by a sandspit at low tide. A small bridge was built to connect Huahine Nui and Huahine Iti. Its highest point is Turi, at 669 m elevation.

In the northwest of Huahine Nui lies a  brackish lake known as Lac Fauna Nui (Lac Maeva). This lake is all that remains of the ancient atoll lagoon. Air transportation is available via Huahine airport, located on the northern shore of Huahine Nui.

Flora and fauna

The island is covered with lush vegetation, much of which consists of coconut palms. There are also two important botanical gardens: the Ariiura Garden Paradise, which houses traditional Polynesian medicinal plants, and l'Eden Parc, where fruit trees from the rest of the world are cultivated.

The fauna is especially rich in fish and birds. Among the latter is a species that became extinct centuries ago, the Huahine starling (Aplonis diluvialis), whose fossils found on the island date its disappearance some seven centuries ago (although the German naturalist Georg Forster depicted in the 18th century a bird on the island of Raiatea very similar to the animal in question).

Administration

Administratively Huahine is a commune (municipality) part of the administrative subdivision of the Leeward Islands. Huahine consists of the following associated communes:
 Faie
 Fare
 Fitii
 Haapu
 Maeva
 Maroe
 Parea
 Tefarerii

The administrative centre of the commune is the settlement of Fare, on Huahine Nui.

Demographics
The total population was 5,999 inhabitants in the 2007 census, which increased to 6075 inhabitants in 2017, distributed in eight Villages: Fare (the capital), Maeva, Faie, Fiti'i, Parea, Tefareri'i, Ha'apu and Maroe.

The main activities are vanilla cultivation, copra production, fishing and tourism.

Sport
In terms of sports, Huahine is, along with neighboring Bora Bora, Tahaa and Raiatea, one of the four islands among which the Hawaiki Nui Va'a, an international Polynesian canoe (va'a) competition, is held.

Religion
Most of the population follows Christianity as a result of the activity of missionaries from both the Catholic Church and various Protestant groups, and European colonization.

In 1809 the island had its first contact with Protestant Christian missionaries. In 1815 the Protestant mission ordered the destruction of the idols of the ancient gods of the local religion. In the following decades, Catholic missionaries arrived. Between 1819 and 1820 the first chapel was built on the island.

Catholics, under the direction of the Archdiocese of Papeete, administer 1 religious building, the Church of the Holy Family (Église de la Sainte-Famille) which was reopened in the town of Fare (northwest of the island) on 30 October 2010. The original church had been established however between 1906 and 1909.

Economy

The inhabitants of the island are engaged in activities such as agriculture and fishing. Agricultural products include vanilla (vanilla tahitiensis species) and various types of melons. Thanks to the lush coconut forest, copra production is also a very important activity for the local economy.

Tourism
Tourism through cruise ship passengers calling at the atoll and the airport is another important economic sector.

One of the famous attractions on Huahine is a bridge that crosses over a stream with 0.9 m – 1.8 m long freshwater eels. These eels are deemed sacred by the locals, by local mythology.  While viewing these slithering creatures, tourists can buy a can of mackerel and feed the eels. The Fa'ahia archaeological site in the north of the island has revealed subfossil remains of several species of extinct birds exterminated by the earliest Polynesian colonists of the island.

Transportation

The island has scheduled passenger airline flights operated by Air Tahiti with ATR turboprop aircraft via the Huahine - Fare Airport.

See also

 Dependent Territory
List of monarchs of Huahine

References

External links
Tahiti Tourism Board website
Tourism portal on Huahine
Free travel guide – Bilingual french english – 2016–2017

 
Communes of French Polynesia